Robackia is a genus of European non-biting midges in the subfamily Chironominae of the bloodworm family Chironomidae.

Species
R. claviger (Townes, 1945)
R. demeijerei (Kruseman, 1933)
R. pilicauda Sæther, 1977

References

Chironomidae
Diptera of Europe